Emerio is a Singapore headquartered IT services company that was founded in 1997. Emerio has 2,000+ employees in 7 countries with delivery centres in Singapore, Malaysia, Indonesia, India, Philippines, Thailand, and Australia. They provide Application, Infrastructure, and Professional services.

The company was founded by Harish NiM, with an initial start-up investment of SGD 12,000.
 
In June 2010, Emerio was acquired by NTT Communications, part of the NTT Group. NTT Communications provides consultancy, architecture, security, and cloud services to optimise the information and communications technology (ICT) environments of enterprises.

Emerio has delivery centres in Singapore, India, Malaysia, Indonesia, Thailand, Philippines, and Australia.

References 

Technology companies of Singapore
Companies established in 1997